Kilen Woods State Park is a state park of Minnesota, USA, on the Des Moines River south of Windom.

External links
Kilen Woods State Park

1945 establishments in Minnesota
Protected areas established in 1945
Protected areas of Jackson County, Minnesota
State parks of Minnesota